Juan Luis Sosa Encarnación (born August 19, 1975) is a former Major League Baseball player who played for two seasons. He played as a shortstop in the minor leagues but spent most of his time in the majors as a center fielder. He played for the Colorado Rockies in 1999 and the Arizona Diamondbacks in 2001. While with the Arizona Diamondbacks in 2001, appearing in one game, he had one at bat and struck out. He also had an assist playing third base. However, he received a 2001 World Series championship ring.

External links

1975 births
Living people
Arizona Diamondbacks players
Baseball players at the 2007 Pan American Games
Carolina Mudcats players
Clearwater Phillies players
Clearwater Threshers players
Colorado Rockies players
Colorado Springs Sky Sox players
Dominican Republic expatriate baseball players in the United States
El Paso Diablos players

Major League Baseball players from the Dominican Republic
Major League Baseball pitchers
Reading Phillies players
Salem Avalanche players
Savannah Sand Gnats players
Scranton/Wilkes-Barre Red Barons players
Tucson Sidewinders players
Vero Beach Dodgers players
Yakima Bears players
Pan American Games competitors for the Dominican Republic